The last name Larreta may make reference to:

 Alberto Rodriguez Larreta, Argentine racing driver
 Antonio Larreta, Uruguayan writer
 Eduardo Rodríguez Larreta, foreign minister of Uruguay
 Enrique Larreta, Argentine art collector
 Also the Museo de Arte Español Enrique Larreta, named after him
 Horacio Rodríguez Larreta, Argentine politician